The Center for Neurotechnology (CNT) is an Engineering Research Center funded by the National Science Foundation to create devices to restore the body's capabilities for sensation and movement. The National Science Foundation has awarded the CNT $~30 million since 2011.

The CNT is based at the University of Washington, and its main partner organizations are Massachusetts Institute of Technology (MIT) and San Diego State University (SDSU).

CNT researchers specialize in fields related to neural engineering including: Biological and traditional engineering, computer science, applied mathematics, neurological surgery, neuroscience and neurobiology and philosophy. Center faculty also hail from various fields of medicine and assist with real-world implementation of designs. The CNT places a strong emphasis on neuroethics, exploring how ethical issues such as identity, privacy, and moral or legal responsibility in relation to the expanding field of neural technologies.

In September 2018, the Center for Sensorimotor Neural Engineering (CSNE) changed its name to the Center for Neurotechnology (CNT) to highlight the role of neurotechnologies in healing the brain and spinal cord.

Mission
The CNT's mission is to develop innovative neural devices and methods for directing engineered neuroplasticity in the brain and spinal cord, which will improve sensory and motor function for people with spinal cord injury, stroke and other neurological disorders. Engineered neuroplasticity is a new form of rehabilitation that uses engineered devices to re-wire the nervous system and restore lost or injured connections in the brain and spinal cord.

Research

Testbeds
Cortical Plasticity Testbed: The goal of this testbed is to engineer neuroplasticity in the brain, improving the brain's ability to adapt and recover after injury. It is targeted toward people with neurological disorders such as stroke. This is where center researchers test the ability of neural stimulation protocols to induce activity-dependent neuroplasticity by remodeling neural connections between cortical regions in the brain.
Spinal Plasticity Testbed: This testbed directly tests researchers ability to engineer neuroplasticity within the spinal cord after injury. For example, center researchers are using electrical spinal stimulation synchronized with residual muscle activity or movement in order to produce lasting improvements in hand and arm function after spinal cord injury.
Co-adaptation Testbed: This testbed focuses on understanding and developing mathematical algorithms designed to help a brain–computer interface co-adapt with the brain itself in a neural stimulation system. An example of work in this testbed is to quantify large-scale cortical dynamics during learning and neuroplasticity induction, as well as changes in cortical dynamics that occur when users directly control brain stimulation using their thoughts.

Thrusts
A Research Thrust is the fundamental knowledge or basic research that investigators bring to the center. These thrusts feed into technologies that exist and that CNT researchers are focusing on, including electrocorticography, the practice of placing electrodes on the brain to record electrical activity. These new technologies are then integrated into research testbeds.

Thrust 1: Communication and Interface
The Communication and Interface thrust is largely concerned with developing more intelligent ways of extracting information from the brain, interpreting them, and then providing feedback to the neural system. The objective of developing these intelligent systems is to use less power to compute faster, and, potentially, harvest their power through innovative sources. At the same time, these systems must be user-friendly. In other words, they must be easy to use and reliable in mechanical design and computation functions. An objective of this thrust is to develop an electrocorticography (ECoG) system that is compact and power efficient enough to be fully implantable.

Thrust 2: Computational Neuroscience
The object of Thrust 2 is to better understand neural circuit dynamics and develop co-adaptive mathematical algorithms for inducing neuroplasticity in the brain and spinal cord. A deeper understanding of the brain's computation will inform design of sensorimotor devices for neural control and allow for more targeted future work on investigating neural function. Using this knowledge, inorganic systems can be better engineered to better interact with the brain's endogenous system of computation.

Thrust 3: Experimental Neuroscience
The Experimental Neuroscience thrust seeks to uncover fundamental principles of sensorimotor neuroscience by performing innovative closed-loop experiments enabled by CNT hardware and computational advances.

Thrust 4: Neuroethics
The Neuroethics thrust is concerned with understanding and exploring ethical issues like privacy, normality, and moral or legal responsibilities in relation to neural technologies. One focus is on ensuring that people with disabilities are involved at every point in the development of the technologies that are ultimately aimed at assisting them. The neuroethics team conducts focus group discussions with these "end users" to help guide the work of other CNT researchers concerned with developing these assistive systems.

Educational Programs
The CNT places emphasis on more than completing research; it also emphasizes educating the next generation of researchers. While this includes traditional programs at the graduate level, the CNT participates in programs designed to educate undergraduates, K-12 students, and K-12 teachers. The CNT uses these programs to encourage diversity and inclusion of minorities and persons with disabilities. The CNT operates as a host site for NSF programs, including: Research Experiences for Undergraduates and Research Experiences for Teachers.

Research Experiences for Undergraduates (REU)
As a host site for NSF's REU program, the CNT hosts students from across the United States for ten weeks during the summer. REU students conduct research in CNT labs, attend lectures and take part in classes covering scientific communications and research methods.

Research Experiences for Veterans (REV)
The center sponsors a program for veterans on the University of Washington's Seattle campus. Similar to the REU program, participants from across the United States take part in research at the interface of biology and engineering for ten weeks during the summer. REV participants work in CNT labs, attend lectures and learn about scientific communications and research methods.

Research Experiences for Teachers (RET)
Similar to the NSF REU program, the RET program places teachers in CNT labs. Participating teachers develop lesson plans to take back to the classroom; these lesson plans are posted on the CNT website for anyone to access and use.

Young Scholars Program (YSP)
The Young Scholars Program is a summer program designed to give high school students the opportunity to conduct research in an academic laboratory setting before entering college. In 2017, the CNT piloted a condensed version of this program called YSP-REACH. YSP-REACH is a five-day summer program at the University of Washington. High school students receive an introduction to neuroscience and neural engineering, neuroethics, scientific communication and the latest developments in brain-computer interfaces. The goal of YSP and YSP-REACH is to provide students with exposure to the field of neural engineering and provide basic preparation for college studies in STEM subjects as well as future STEM careers.

Undergraduate Curriculum
The CNT has developed new undergraduate curriculum for the University of Washington that includes the course Neural Engineering, Neural Engineering Lab and Neural Engineering Tech Studio. An undergraduate minor in Neural Computation and Engineering is now available. Materials from these courses will be disseminated to partner institutions.

Graduate Curriculum
The CNT has developed new curriculum for a graduate certificate in Neural Computation and Engineering that includes two new courses. In addition, the CNT supports exchange students to promote an international spirit of collaboration within the field.

Academic Partners
University of Washington
Caltech
Morehouse College
Spelman College
Southwestern College
University of British Columbia
University of Freiburg

References

Sensorimotor Neural Engineering, Center
Sensorimotor Neural Engineering, Center
Neural engineering
Sensorimotor Neural Engineering, Center
Massachusetts Institute of Technology
San Diego State University
Research institutes established in 2011
2011 establishments in Washington (state)
2011 in science
Medical and health organizations based in Washington (state)
University of Washington organizations